Stapper is a surname. Notable people with the name include:

William Stapper, English politician
Stephen Stapper, English politician